Yupia is the headquarters of Papum Pare district in the state of Arunachal Pradesh in India. Yupia is about 20 km from Itanagar, the state capital.

Education
National Institute of Technology, Arunachal Pradesh is located here.

References

Papum Pare district
Cities and towns in Papum Pare district